Aulis Venneri Ranta-Muotio (born 29 May 1946 in Teuva) is a Finnish agronomist, farmer and politician. He was a member of the Parliament of Finland from 1995 to 2007, representing the Centre Party.

References

1946 births
Living people
People from Teuva
Centre Party (Finland) politicians
Members of the Parliament of Finland (1995–99)
Members of the Parliament of Finland (1999–2003)
Members of the Parliament of Finland (2003–07)
University of Helsinki alumni